Duncan McMillan may refer to:
 Duncan McMillan (linguist) (1914–1993), British linguist and philologist
 Duncan McMillan (footballer) (1922–1992), Scottish professional footballer

See also
Duncan MacMillan (disambiguation)